The Palos Verdes Stakes is a Grade III American thoroughbred horse race for four-year-olds and older over a distance of six furlongs on the dirt track held annually in late January or early February at Santa Anita Park in Arcadia, California, USA. The event currently carries a purse of $200,000.

History

The event is named after one of the first California land grants known as Rancho San Pedro consisting today of the Pacific coast cities of Los Angeles harbor, San Pedro, the Palos Verdes Peninsula and other cities in Los Angeles County including Rancho Palos Verdes which is approximately 50 miles from Santa Anita Park.

Pre World War II (1936) 
The first running of the event known as the Palos Verdes Handicap was on 25 February 1936. The event was for three-year-olds and older for a purse of $1,200 with seven starters. The event was won by Mars heiress Mrs. Ethel V. Mars's Milky Way Farm Stable – The Fighter, trained by Robert V. McGarvey and ridden by US Hall of Fame jockey Alfred M. Robertson by a margin  lengths in a relatively fast time of 1:11 flat on a drying track.
The Fighter was the only three-year-old in the field and was preparing for the U.S. Triple Crown events. Later in May, The Fighter ran in the 1936 Kentucky Derby where he was prominent early in the event but faded to finish eleventh.

Post World War II 

The event would not be held for fifteen years and was reinstated by Santa Anita Track Administration as part of the stakes program for the opening week of the 1951–52 Winter Meeting. The event would grown in prominence in the 1950s and would become an Opening Day feature for the track's Winter Meetings. The first time the event was held on an Opening 
Day was on 26 December 1953 and 62,000 were on hand to see 18/1 longshot Heliowise winning by the shortest of margins and setting a new stakes record of 1:09. The following year Imbros carried a remarkable 128 pounds giving eighteen pounds to the fine sprinter Berseem (second place) and Hour Regards (third place) and would equal the track record for the six furlongs distance of 1:09 flat. Ten years later Imbros's son, one of California's all-time favorite horses, Native Diver would win the first of his two victories in the event.

Other notable winners from this era were the 1956 winner Porterhouse who was the 1953 US Champion Two-Year-Old Male. Revel, the 1961 winner carried 127 pounds defeating the 1960 winner Ole Fols  by  lengths as the 3/2 favorite. In 1963 Cyrano easily defeated Sledge by three lengths with the favorite Olden Times a further  lengths away setting a new track record of 1:08 for the distance.

US Hall of Famer Native Diver won the 1964 rendition of the event in front of 70,024 on Opening Day. The following year Native Diver carried a mammoth 129 pounds and led throughout to win by a neck as the 1/2on favorite.

The event was scheduled to be held on Opening Day in 1969 but due to a strike by racetrack employees the race was not run. The event was rescheduled for later in January 1970 but the strike continued until early February and the race was canceled.

For the 1970–71 Winter Meeting the event was scheduled on Saturday, 2 January 1971 for horses four-years-old or older. Hence, the event was also not held in 1970. The great Ack Ack was assigned 129 pounds and started as the 4/5 odds-on favorite but was soundly beaten by Jungle Savage by three lengths.  The following Winter Meeting (1971–72) the event was scheduled in December and conditions were for three-year-olds and older. King of Cricket won by a stakes record margin of six lengths.

Classification and Breeders' Cup era 
In 1973 when the American Graded Stakes Committee began the classification of US thoroughbred races the event was installed with Grade III status. The event held that status for one year in 1974 before the event was downgraded to Listed. The winner of the 1974 rendition, Ancient Title carried 126 pounds to victory as an 11/10 favorite atoning for his third place in the previous year. Ancient Title would again run third in 1976 to the three-year-old Maheras. From 1985 until 2011 both Hollywood Park and Santa Anita Park Administration carded an event in honor of Ancient Title known as the Ancient Title Handicap. Today the event is known as the Grade II Santa Anita Sprint Championship, run over the same distance as the Palos Verdes Stakes but is held in the fall.

In 1982 with a massive crowd of 69,293 the event was won by Chinook Pass who easily won by three lengths and equaled the track record of 1:07. Chinook Pass would continue his fine form into 1983 and would be voted US Champion Sprint Horse. Phone Trick continued his undefeated streak of six in 1985 when he easily won by  lengths as the 4/5 odds-on favorite. Phone Trick's career would end with an injury the following year after a 10 start, 9 wins and one second career.

In 1988 the event was upgraded back to Grade III. In 1990 the event was held for the last time in December. For the 1991–92 Winter Meeting the Santa Anita Administration scheduled the event in February 1992 as a four-year-olds and older. The event has held its place in the racing calendar schedule as either being run in late January or early February.

The first participant than ran in the Palos Verdes Handicap to make an impact at the Breeders' Cup was Cardmania. In 1993 Cardmania finished third to 14/1 longshot Music Merci, beaten by about  lengths after leading into the straight. A consistent sprinter Cardmania had eight starts without any victories before hitting form in mid-October and winning the Ancient Title Breeders' Cup Handicap. The following start Cardmania won the Breeders' Cup Sprint and later was voted US Champion Sprint Champion for 1983. Music Merci finished sixth in the same event.

The first horse to win the Palos Verdes Handicap and Breeders' Cup Sprint in the same year (1996) was the gray horse Lit de Justice. Lit de Justice finished third in the 1995 Breeders' Cup Sprint at Belmont Park. After returning to California, Lit de Justice finished second in an allowance at Hollywood Park Racetrack and in his first run of 1996 would win the now discontinued El Conejo Handicap over the shorter  furlong distance easily by  lengths. Next start Lit de Justice prevailed in the Palos Verdes Handicap as the 11/10 favorite. In his last start of the year and his career Lit de Justice won the 1996 Breeders' Cup Sprint at Woodbine Racetrack in Canada and was crowned the US Champion Sprint Champion.

In 1998 the event was upgraded to Grade II and would hold this status until 2020.

In 2000 as a six-year-old Kona Gold also captured the Palos Verdes Handicap and then later in year the Breeders' Cup Sprint and was crowned the US Champion Sprint Champion. Kona Gold also finished second in the 1999 running of Palos Verdes Handicap and as a nine-year-old finished last of six entrants as the 7/5 favorite beaten by the Argentine-bred Avanzado by  lengths.

In 2007 Santa Anita Park administration installed a new All-weather track and for the 2008 the winner was In Summation who set a new stakes and track record for the distance with a time of 1:06.67. Since 2011 the event has been held on the dirt track. In 2011 the conditions of the event were changed to as stakes with allowance and the name of the event was modified to the Palos Verdes Stakes.

The winner of the 2018 running of the event only four horses were entered and was won by the 2017 Breeders' Cup Sprint winner and US Champion Sprint Champion Roy H who was the overwhelming 1/5 odds-on favorite who toyed with his opponents winning by  lengths. Later in the year Roy H repeated winning the Breeders' Cup Sprint and once again voted as US Champion Sprint Champion for 2018. In 2019 Roy H returned to face five opponents in the Palos Verdes Stakes and again easily won the race by 4 lengths as the 3/10 odds-on favorite becoming the second two-time winner of the event.

Records

Speed record:
 1:06.67 - In Summation (2008)

Margins:
 lengths – Impressive Luck (1977)
 6 lengths  – King of Cricket (1971)

Most wins:
 2 – Native Diver (1964, 1965)
 2 – Roy H (2018, 2019)

Most wins by an owner:
 3 – Llangollen Farm (1956, 1957, 1966)
 3 – David A. Bernsen (2017, 2018, 2019)

Most wins by a jockey:
 7 – Laffit Pincay, Jr. (1968, 1974, 1976, 1982, 1985, 1992, 2001)

Most wins by a trainer:
 4 – Buster Millerick (1955, 1964, 1965, 1967)
 4 – Charles E. Whittingham (1956, 1957, 1959, 1966)
 4 – Peter Miller (2017, 2018, 2019, 2020)
 4 – Bob Baffert (1997, 2011, 2022, 2023)

Winners

Legend:

 

Notes:

§ Ran as an entry

See also
List of American and Canadian Graded races

External links
 2020 Santa Anita Media Guide

References

Horse races in California
Santa Anita Park
Graded stakes races in the United States
Open sprint category horse races
Flat horse races for four-year-olds
Recurring sporting events established in 1936
1936 establishments in California
Grade 3 stakes races in the United States